The 1996 MTV Europe Music Awards ceremony was hosted by former Take That member Robbie Williams and held at Alexandra Palace in London, England, on 14 November 1996.

One special note was that MTV executives notified the band Metallica that expletives were prohibited during their live TV performance and they were not allowed to use pyro. The band was upset by this so the band disregarded performing their scheduled single "King Nothing" and played the non-TV friendly songs "Last Caress" and "So What?", songs that contain numerous expletives,  and reference rape, murder and bestiality, respectively. The result was the performance and any references to Metallica during the ceremony have been removed from future broadcasts of the ceremony. Metallica was banned from MTV for years following this act of rebellion.

Nominations
Winners are in bold text.

Performances 
The Fugees — "Ready or Not"
George Michael — "Star People"
Boyzone (featuring Peter André) — "Motown Medley" ("Dancing in the Street" / "Signed, Sealed, Delivered I'm Yours" / "Never Can Say Goodbye" / "Celebration")
Eros Ramazzotti — "Più bella cosa"
The Smashing Pumpkins — "Bullet with Butterfly Wings"
Simply Red (featuring Refugee Camp) — "Angel"
Kula Shaker — "Tattva"
Metallica — "Last Caress / So What?" (originally meant to be King Nothing)
Garbage — "Milk"
Bryan Adams — "The Only Thing That Looks Good on Me Is You"

Appearances 
Julian Clary — hosted a backstage party where he interviewed various celebrities
Neneh Cherry and Jay Kay — presented Best Group
Adam Clayton and Larry Mullen, Jr. — presented the Breakthrough award
Jacques Villeneuve and Helena Christensen — presented Best Rock
Richard E. Grant and Björk — presented Best Male
Gina G and 3T — presented MTV Amour
Joaquín Cortés and Jerry Hall — presented Best Female
Jarvis Cocker — presented the Free Your Mind award
Goldie and MC Solaar — presented Best Dance
Robert Miles and Westernhagen — presented MTV Select
Jean Paul Gaultier and Skin — presented Best Song

See also
1996 MTV Video Music Awards

External links
1996 MTV Europe Music Awards at IMDb
Nominees

1996
1996 music awards
1996 in England
Culture in London
1996 in London
1996 in British music
November 1996 events in the United Kingdom